France is both a given name and a French, Czech or Slovene surname. In France, it may derive from an ethnic name for an inhabitant of the country; a variant is Lafrance. In the Czech Republic, the surname may relate to the word Franc. In Slovenia, France may derive from the personal name "France", a vernacular form of "Francišek", Latin Franciscus ("Francis"). It may also be an Americanized spelling of the German surname "Franz".

Male name
In Slovenia, France is a male name, a variant of the name Franciscus.
 France Adamič (1911–2014), Slovene agronomist
 France Ahčin (1919–1989), Slovene sculptor
 France Ačko (1904–1974), Slovene musician, organist and composer
 France Balantič (1921–1943), Slovene poet
 France Bevk (1890–1970), Slovene writer, poet and translator
 France Bučar (1923–2015), Slovene politician, legal expert and author
 France Cukjati (born 1943), Slovene politician, physician and theologist
 France Dejak (1925–2003), Slovene soldier and Kočevski Rog massacre survivor
 France Laux (1897–1978), American sports announcer
 France Prešeren (1800–1849), Slovene romantic poet
 France Rode (1934–2017), Slovenian engineer and inventor
 France Staub (1920–2005), Mauritian ornithologist, herpetologist and botanist
 France Štiglic (1919–1993), Slovene film director and screenwriter
 France Vodnik (1903–1986), Slovene writer and poet

Female name
In French-speaking countries, France may be a woman's first name.
 France A. Córdova (born 1947), American astrophysicist and administrator
 France D'Amour (born 1967), French-Canadian singer and songwriter
 France Gall (1947–2018), French pop singer
 France Gélinas, Canadian politician
 France Joli (born 1963), Canadian singer and songwriter
 France Nuyen (born 1939), French-Vietnamese actress now psychological counselor

Surname
 Alfred E. France (1927–2015), American politician
 Anatole France, nom de plume of French writer François-Anatole Thibault (1844–1924)
 Cécile de France (born 1975), Belgian actress
 C. V. France (1868–1949), English actor
 Eurilda Loomis France (1865–1931), American painter
 Ellen France (born 1956), New Zealand judge
 Kai Kara-France (born 1993), New Zealand mixed martial artist
 Michael France (1962–2013), American screenwriter
 Pierre Mendès France (1907–1982), French prime minister
 Raoul Heinrich Francé (1874-1943), Austro-Hungarian botanist, microbiologist and philosopher 
 R. T. France, (1938–2012), New Testament scholar and Anglican cleric
 Ryan France (born 1980), English footballer
 Shirley May France (1932–2012), American swimmer
 Ty France (born 1994), American baseball infielder
 J.P. France (born 1995), American baseball pitcher

Related surnames
Lafrance (name)

References

French-language surnames
Czech-language surnames
Slovene masculine given names
Americanized surnames